Blue Grass is an unincorporated community in Wadena County, Minnesota, United States.

Notes

Unincorporated communities in Minnesota
Unincorporated communities in Wadena County, Minnesota